Club Deportivo Héroes de Caborca was a Mexican football club that plays in the Tercera División de México. The club is based in Caborca, Sonora and was founded in 2004.

Honours
 Tercera División de México (1): 2009–10'''

See also
Football in Mexico
Tercera División de México

External links
Official page on LigaMX.net

References 

Association football clubs established in 2014
Football clubs in Sonora
2014 establishments in Mexico